The 2008 Four Continents Figure Skating Championships was an international figure skating competition in the 2007–08 season. It was held at the Seongsa Ice Rink in Goyang, South Korea on February 11–17. Medals were awarded in the disciplines of men's singles, ladies' singles, pair skating, and ice dancing.

Notes
 Unlike the other three ISU championships, each nation was allowed to enter 3 skaters/couples in each event, regardless of its skaters performance in the previous year's championships.
 The corresponding competition for European skaters was the 2008 European Figure Skating Championships.
 Skaters must have reached the age of 15 by July 1, 2007 in order to compete.

Medals table

Results

Men

Daisuke Takahashi set a new world record for the free skating (175.84) and the combined total (264.41).

Ladies

Pairs

Ice dancing

References

External links

 ISU site
 Starting Orders and Results
 Competitors list
  

Four Continents Figure Skating Championships
Four Continents
F
Four Continents
International figure skating competitions hosted by South Korea
Sports competitions in Goyang